Uranium mining in Kazakhstan is of considerable importance to the national economy. By 2011, Kazakhstan was considered to be the world's largest producer of uranium.

History
Uranium exploration in Kazakhstan began in 1943. Later, in 1970, mining began with positive results, leading to more exploration. Some underground mines from the 1950s remain, but are close to depletion. In the past half century, Kazakhstan has been a major source of uranium for the world's nuclear programs. In the decade from 2001 to 2011, Kazakhstan's uranium production increased by 17,428 tons. Kazakhstan has 15% of the world's uranium, and in 2011, Kazakhstan was responsible for 35% of world production. There are 17 uranium mines in the country, however, maximum output is capped at 20,000 tons per year.

Currently, 50 deposits are located in six provinces. The responsibility for uranium exploration falls upon two subsidiary organizations of the Ministry of Geology, “Stepgeology” in northern Kazakhstan and “Volkovgeology” in the  southern part of the country. Though there is no nationally supported electrical grid, in northern areas of Kazakhstan, electricity comes from Russia, and in the south, Uzbekistan and Kyrgyzstan.

Companies
Kazatomprom, the nationalized nuclear energy company, was started in 1997. It has oversight of all nuclear activities including mining, exploration, and import/export activities. The company has also formed strong ties with foreign nuclear powers and the company Westinghouse. Agreements are in place with the governments of Russia, Japan, China, Canada, India, and France. Comparing 2010 with 2009, it reported an over forty percent increase in uranium production, and a thirty percent increase in total uranium output.

Mines

Inkai Uranium Project- discovered 1976. 2010 production: 1637 tons
South Inkai mine - began production 2007. expected 2011 production: 1900 tons
Akdala mine - began production: 2006. 2009 production: 1046 tons
Central Mynkuduk mine - began production: 2007. 
West Mynkuduk mine - began production: 2006
East Mynkuduk mine- began production: 2006
Karatau mine - began production: 2008
Akbastau mine - began production: 2009
Zhalpak mine- began production: 2012
Moinkum mine - began production: 2004 
Tortkuduk mine - began production: 2008
Kharasan mine- began production: 2005
Irkol mine - began production:2008
Zarechnoye mine- began production:2006
Semyibai mine- began production: 2009

See also

Energy policy of Kazakhstan
Semipalatinsk Test Site
Anti-nuclear movement in Kazakhstan
Kharasan mine

References

 

 
Mining in Kazakhstan